Emilie Beckmann (born 4 February 1997) is a Danish swimmer. She competed in the women's 100 metre butterfly event at the 2017 World Aquatics Championships.

References

External links
 

1997 births
Living people
Danish female freestyle swimmers
Place of birth missing (living people)
Danish female butterfly swimmers
European Aquatics Championships medalists in swimming
Swimmers at the 2020 Summer Olympics
Olympic swimmers of Denmark
21st-century Danish women